Socket 754 is a CPU socket originally developed by AMD to supersede its Athlon XP platform (Socket 462, also referred to as Socket A).  Socket 754 was the first socket developed by AMD to support their new consumer version of the 64 bit microprocessor family known as AMD64.

Technical specifications

Socket 754 was the original socket for AMD's Athlon 64 desktop processors. Due to the introduction of newer socket layouts (i.e. Socket 939, Socket 940 and Socket AM2), Socket 754 became the more "budget-minded" socket for use with AMD Athlon 64 or Sempron processors. It differs from Socket 939 in several areas:
 support for a single channel memory controller (64 bits wide) with a maximum of three unbuffered DIMMs, or four registered DIMMs
 no dual channel support
 lower HyperTransport speed (800 MHz Bi-Directional, 16 bit data path, up and downstream)
 lower effective data bandwidth (9.6 GB/s)
 lower motherboard manufacturing costs

Although AMD promoted Socket 754 as a budget platform on the desktop and encouraged mid- and high-end users to use newer platforms, Socket 754 remained for some time as AMD's high-end solution for mobile applications, (e.g. the HP zv6000 series). However, Socket S1 was released and superseded Socket 754 in the mobile CPU segment, with support for dual-core CPUs and DDR2 SDRAM.

Heatsink 
The 2 holes for fastening the heatsink to the motherboard are placed at a distance of 90 mm.

Availability

The first processors using Socket 754 came on the market in the second half of 2003.  Socket 754 was phased out in favor of Socket 939 on desktops because of low sales. The socket remained in use for laptops until it was replaced by S1 in 2006.

See also
List of AMD microprocessors
List of AMD Athlon 64 microprocessors
List of AMD Sempron microprocessors

References

External links 

 
 AMD 754 Pin Package Functional Data Sheet

AMD sockets